is a railway station in Takehara, Hiroshima Prefecture, Japan. Takehara station is mentioned in the slice-of-life anime series Tamayura.

References

Railway stations in Hiroshima Prefecture
Railway stations in Japan opened in 1932